Otis Crandall Davis (born July 12, 1932) is a former American athlete, winner of two gold medals for record-breaking performances in both the 400 m and 4 × 400 m relay at the 1960 Summer Olympics. Davis set a new world record of 44.9 seconds in the 400 m event, and he became the first man to break the 45-second barrier.

Early life
Otis Crandall Davis was born in Tuscaloosa, Alabama on July 12, 1932. He is black and Native American. He served four years in the United States Air Force, during the Korean War.

Career

College athletics
Following the Air Force, Davis attended the University of Oregon on a basketball scholarship, hoping to one day becoming a professional. One day in 1958 while observing athletes running on the track with a friend, Davis, who had never run before, nor attended schools in his youth with sports programs other than basketball and football, decided that he could beat the athletes he saw on the track. He approached track coach Bill Bowerman, who would later become the founding father of the Nike, Inc., and asked to join the track team. Bowerman, who needed high jumpers, had Davis try his hand at that event. Among Davis' first attempts at the high jump, he jumped 6–0. Recalls Davis, "I had no form. I had no style. I just jumped." He also hit 23–0 in the long jump with little effort, though Davis was flustered by the sprinting events, relating "I didn't even know how to get in the starting blocks". In his first competitive event, Bowerman entered Davis in the 220-yard dash and the 440-yard dash in the Pacific Coast Conference championships, both of which Davis won, missing the school record by two tenths of a second in the latter event.

According to Davis, Bowerman made the first pair of Nike shoes for him, contradicting the claim that they were made for Phil Knight. Says Davis, "I told Tom Brokaw that I was the first. I don't care what all the billionaires say. Bill Bowerman made the first pair of shoes for me. People don't believe me. In fact, I didn't like the way they felt on my feet. There was no support and they were too tight. But I saw Bowerman make them from the waffle iron, and they were mine."

In 1960, Davis was competing on a national level for the Oregon Ducks, and was poised to becoming a national AAU champion in the 440-yard run.

Olympic career

The same year, at the age of 28, Davis made the U.S. Olympic team. He ran his fastest time to date one week before participating in the 1960 Summer Olympics in Rome as one of the oldest members of the track team, where he was nicknamed "Pops" by his teammates. According to Davis, "I was still learning how to turn with the staggered starts and all. I was still learning the strategy involved. I was still learning how to run in the lanes."

Davis competed against the heavily favored German athlete Carl Kaufmann, who was the world record holder in the 400-meter dash. Davis won by a hair over Kaufmann, setting a world record of 44.9 seconds and becoming the first man to break the heralded 45-second barrier. The photo of the finish, with (in full horizontal dive position) Kaufmann's nose ahead of Davis, but his torso behind, has been studied and discussed by track and field officials for years. Both athletes were awarded the world record time, recorded in the 10ths of a second in those days, but Davis was awarded the win. Two days later, Davis and Kaufmann met again for the 4 × 400 m relay final. He held off the challenge, anchoring home the gold with another world record performance of 3:02.2. The photo of the finish of that race was also made famous in Life magazine.

It was also at the 1960 games that Davis met and became friends with Muhammad Ali. Davis comments, "Boy, you think I talk a lot, but I couldn't get a word in with him. And since he's a boxer and I'm a runner, I couldn't really argue with that. We just kind of gelled."

Post-Olympic career
Following the Olympics, Davis competed in some sporadic track meets, such as the 1961 U.S. Nationals at Randall's Island, where at age 29, Davis was victorious, but his competitive running career was virtually over, as he never repeated his Olympic performance. He returned to Oregon, where he obtained his degree, a B.S. Health & Physical Education, in 1960. He later considered playing as wide receiver for the Los Angeles Rams. After retiring from competition, Davis become a high school teacher, working in Springfield, Oregon for many years, and then traveled overseas to work as an athletic director at United States military bases, including McGuire Air Force Base in New Jersey, where he taught in 1989. He also taught various after-school programs for gifted students.

In 1991, Davis moved to Jersey City, New Jersey, in order to live closer to New York, eventually settling in Union City sometime after December 2008. In 1996 he was a torch-bearer for the Summer Olympics in Atlanta.

Around 2002 or 2003, Davis was hired by the Union City Board of Education, and began working at Emerson High School as a truancy officer, teacher, coach and mentor. When he was inducted into the National Track and Field Hall of Fame in 2003, he asked Emerson Principal Robert Fazio to accompany him to the ceremony in Los Angeles, and when the rest of the school's staff discovered that Davis was an Olympic medalist, they honored him with a banner posted in a hallway in the school honoring his achievements.

In 2012, Davis was working as a verification officer at Union City High School, mentoring students, some of whom have gone on to win the United States Olympians Tri-States Chapter Annual Achievement Award, which is awarded to New York, New Jersey and Connecticut students. The top five winners in 2012 were Union City students. He is also co-founder and, in 2012, president of the Tri-States Olympic Alumni Association, a member of the University of Oregon Hall of Fame and the New Jersey Sports Writers' Halls of Fame.

Davis ran athletic skills programs during the spring and summer in Union City, in order to reach students who did not normally participate in sporting events, and to complement the schools' physical education curricula. Among the programs that Davis directed were the Mayor's Cup, first held on June 6, 2011, in which students from the city's several elementary schools compete in events that include sprinting, spring relays and circle relays, and the Sports Challenge, which provides special needs children with the opportunity to be a part of sports activities.

Records
World Record 1960: 400 meters 44.9
American Record 1960: 400 meters 44.9

References

External links

Official website
University of Oregon Duck Record Holders

1932 births
Living people
American male sprinters
World record setters in athletics (track and field)
Athletes (track and field) at the 1960 Summer Olympics
Olympic gold medalists for the United States in track and field
Oregon Ducks men's track and field athletes
Track and field athletes from Alabama
Sportspeople from Tuscaloosa, Alabama
People from Jersey City, New Jersey
People from Union City, New Jersey
Medalists at the 1960 Summer Olympics